The 2014–15 Northeastern Huskies men's basketball team represented Northeastern University during the 2014–15 NCAA Division I men's basketball season. The Huskies, led by ninth year head coach Bill Coen, played their home games at Matthews Arena and were members of the Colonial Athletic Association. They finished the season 23–12, 12–6 in CAA play to finish in a four-way tie for the CAA regular season championship. They defeated Delaware, UNC Wilmington, and William & Mary to become champions of the CAA tournament. They received an automatic bid to the NCAA tournament, their first NCAA bid since 1991, where they lost in the second round to Notre Dame.

Previous season 
The Huskies finished the season 23–11, 12–6 in CAA play to finish in first place. They advanced to the finals of the CAA tournament where they defeated William & Mary to win the CAA title.

Departures

Recruiting

Roster

Schedule

|-
!colspan=9 style="background:#CC0000; color:#000000;"| Non-conference regular season

|-
!colspan=9 style="background:#CC0000; color:#000000;"| CAA regular season

|-
!colspan=9 style="background:#CC0000; color:#000000;"| CAA tournament

|-
!colspan=9 style="background:#CC0000; color:#000000;"| NCAA tournament

References

Northeastern Huskies men's basketball seasons
Northeastern
Northeastern